Amo (stylized as AMO) is a Philippine crime drama series, starring Derek Ramsay, Vince Rillon, Allen Dizon, and Felix Roco. The series premiered on TV5 every Saturday 9:30 p.m. (PST). There has been some controversy over its portrayal of the Philippine drug war.

Premise
Despite the Philippine government's crackdown on narcotics, high school student Joseph expands his drug running while his cop uncle profits from corruption.

Joseph, who looks to expand his participation in the drug operation, is not the only member of his family involved in illegal activity; his uncle Camilo, who is a cop, profits from corruption working as part of a gang. While leading a double life together with his brother-in-law Bino, Joseph has run-ins with the law and needs help from family members to get him out of it and cover his tracks.

Cast
Vince Rillon as Joseph Molina
Derek Ramsay as Rodrigo Macaraeg
Allen Dizon as Camilo Molina
Rhea Jai Fernandez as Cristina/Pilar
Felix Roco as Bino Campos
Ruby Ruiz as Myrna Molina
JC Tan as Edgar 
Aldrico Padilla as Tisoy
Elijah Filamor as Kupal
RJ Gratuito as Kiko
Adrianna So as Michelle
Nikko Delos Santos as Chekwa
Elijah Filamor as Kupal
Fred Cortez as Kulot
VJ Parreno as Rodel
Jeff Sison as Kap. Banjo
Natileigh Sitoy as Jillian Molina
Dexter Macaraeg as Enteng Molina
Mae Aniceto as Mare/ School Guard
Ruffa Zuueta as Tranny
Dante Wayan as Mang Celso
Jayzelle Suan as Luningning
Emma Resureccion as Salud
Richard Lopez as Jay
Yoshihiro Hara as Takeo
Rusty M. Loayon as Rapper 1
Russell M. Loayon as Rapper 2
Roman Garcia as Rapper 3
John Rey Espinueva as Gang Member 1
Christine Florendo as Gang member 2
Divina Mhelo as Gang member 3
Jalyn Taboneknek as Gang member 4

Episodes
As aired on 5 (The 5 Network)

Production
Amo was directed by Brillante Mendoza and was produced under TV5 Network.

Release
Amo was set to premiere on TV5 on August 25, 2017. However, it was pushed back due to other sporting events caused by the partnership between American cable sports television network ESPN and TV5 announced in October 2017 to form ESPN5 (now known as One Sports) . It was also one of the few television series invited for screening at the 2017 Cannes International Film Festival. TV5 and Netflix later entered into an agreement with the latter started distributing Amo online to a global audience on April 9, 2018 and was the only Filipino television show distributed by Netflix at the time. But after almost a one year of not airing, Amo was aired on 5 (The 5 Network) from April 21 until July 14, 2018.

References

External links
 Amo at Netflix
 

TV5 (Philippine TV network) drama series
TV5 (Philippine TV network) original programming
2018 Philippine television series debuts
2018 Philippine television series endings
Philippine crime television series
Television series about illegal drug trade
Television series about teenagers
Filipino-language television shows
Philippine drama television series
Philippine Drug War